Jonathan Littman (born 1962/1963) is an American producer who serves as president of Jerry Bruckheimer Television.

Biography
Littman was raised in West Orange, New Jersey, the son of Dr. Harold Littman and Annette Littman. He is a graduate of Vassar College. In 1987, he began his career at ABC working on children’s and late-night programming and then accepted a position in 1989 at NBC as the director of the network's daytime programs including the gameshow Concentration and the soap opera Santa Barbara. In 1991, he joined the newly formed Fox network where he was responsible for current programming and drama development including such shows as Beverly Hills 90210, Melrose Place, and The X-Files. In 1997 he left Fox for Jerry Bruckheimer Films where he was hired to lead the company's expansion into television. While CEO of the television division, he convinced CBS Entertainment chief Nina Tassler to purchase Anthony Zuiker's Crime Scene Investigation concept which evolved into the highly successful CSI: Crime Scene Investigation franchise. Other shows Littman produced while CEO of Jerry Bruckheimer Television include CBS hits The Amazing Race, Cold Case, Without a Trace as well as Fox Television/Netflix's Lucifer and Starz's Hightown.

In July 2022 Littman left JBTV and formed a new production company, Littman Media, focusing on producing television series across all platforms.

Awards and nominations
As of 2022, as part of the CSI and The Amazing Race teams, he has received 22 Emmy nominations and won 10 Emmy Awards.

Personal life
In 1996, he married Nancy Jill Goldman, with whom he attended high school, at the Hotel Bel Air in Los Angeles; and is father to three daughters. He lives in Encino, California.

References

American entertainment industry businesspeople
American television producers
20th-century American Jews
Primetime Emmy Award winners
American reality television producers
1963 births
Living people
21st-century American Jews
Jewish American television producers